In the Chicago mayoral election of 1879, Democrat Carter Harrison Sr. defeated both Republican Abner Wright and socialist Ernst Schmidt in a three-way race. Harrison had a nearly nine point margin of victory.

Two-term incumbent Monroe Heath (who, at the time, was the longest-serving mayor in the city's history) did not run for reelection.

The election took place on April 1.

This was the first of six mayoral elections in which Harrison would ultimately compete, and the first of five of which he would win.

Campaign
Harrison, who had also been approached by the Socialists and the Greenback Party to run on their tickets, ran as the Democratic Party nominee. Harrison's experience in national politics in congress appealed to conservative Democrats like Potter Palmer and Levi Leiter, and his liberal views on liquor consumption and gambling appealed to Democrats such as Michael C. McDonald.

After incumbent Republican Monroe Heath declined to seek reelection, the Republican Party nominated Wright. Wright, a member of the Chicago Board of Trade, would be criticized for having been an inadequate candidate, lacking in energy, charisma, and appearing overly-calculated.

The Chicago Tribune sided against Harrison, arguing that his election would constitute  "bummer restoration".

The previous year the Socialist Labor Party had experienced several successes, seeing the election of one of its nominees for Chicago alderman be elected in the Spring 1878 elections and three of its nominees for state legislature be elected in the Fall 1878 elections.  Fresh off of these successes, the Socialist Labor Party fielded a full ticket of candidates for in municipal elections. Socialist. Their mayoral nominee Dr. Ernest Schmidt helped lead the party to more than double its vote share in the city's elections and see the election of an additional three aldermen. Schmidt had formerly been a Republican. Schmidt had a strong reputation of being "incorruptible".  The Socialist Labor Party had proved particularly adept at attracting German Republican and liberal voters away from the Republican Party. They also attracted strong support from the city's Bohemian population.

After the municipal elections, some would blame the Socialist Labor Party for having a spoiler effect, having siphoned away would-be Republican supporters. The Illinois Staats-Zeitung wrote that, "The socialist have succeeded in deciding the election, to be sure not the advantage of their own candidates, but rather for the Democrats against the Republicans." Dr. Schmidt agreed that blame for the underperformance of the Republican ticket could be attributed to the Republican Party's loss of liberal German voters to the Socialist Labor Party. Nevertheless, others have cast doubt on the idea that Schmidt acted as a spoiler to Wright's campaign. It is in fact, quite possible that the socialist nominee had taken thousands of likely Democratic voters away from Harrison.

During the campaign, Harrison adopted a pet eagle, and would bring it with him on the stump. He would ride around town in a horse-drawn wagon, with his eagle, and with a banner attached to the wagon reading "Carter's Eagle and Victory". While derided by Republicans as a cheap campaign stunt, this levity was appreciated by many voters. This led to Harrison being affectionately nicknamed "the Eagle".

Results
Harrison won the election.

Harrison's victory was assisted by strong voter turnout.

Harrison's victory ended what had been a period of Republican dominance in Chicago's mayoral elections.

Allegations of fraud
Surprised by Wright's loss, Republicans alleged fraud.

At Wright's urging, the Chicago Tribune launched its own investigation into the election. The Tribune alleged that repeat voters had been transported across the city by Democrats to cast votes in various precincts. In addition, the Chicago Inter Ocean alleged that non-residents and non-citizens had cast votes. Other newspapers such as the Chicago Daily News published editorials criticizing Republicans for making these allegations.

Outgoing Republican mayor Heath dismissed allegations of fraud.

Ultimately, Wright withdrew his allegations that fraud had taken pace.

References

Mayoral elections in Chicago
Chicago
Chicago
1870s in Chicago